Bonds is a surname. Notable people with the surname include:

Alfred Bryan Bonds (1913–1989), public servant, college administrator and fifth president of Baldwin-Wallace College
Anita Bonds (born c. 1945), American Democratic politician
Barry Bonds (born 1964), former Major League Baseball player
Bill Bonds (born 1933), former television anchor and reporter
Billy Bonds (born 1946), former British footballer and manager
Bobby Bonds (1946–2003), Major League Baseball player, father of Barry Bonds and Bobby Bonds Jr.
Bobby Bonds Jr. (born 1970), former Minor League Baseball player, brother of Barry Bonds
De'Aundre Bonds (born 1976), American actor
Gary U.S. Bonds (born 1939), American rhythm and blues and rock 'n' roll singer
Jeff Bonds (born 1982), American professional basketball player for the Gießen 46ers
John Bonds (born 1970), American football player
Julia Bonds (1952–2011), anti-coal mining activist, director of CRMW
Margaret Bonds (1913–1972), American composer and pianist
Parris Afton Bonds, American novelist
Rosie Bonds (born 1944), winner of 1964 Summer Olympics 80 meter hurdle, sister of Bobby Bonds
Terrell Bonds (born 1994), American football player